The 1993 Nabisco Dinah Shore was a women's professional golf tournament, held March 25–28 at Mission Hills Country Club in Rancho Mirage, California. This was the 22nd edition of the Nabisco Dinah Shore, and the eleventh as a major championship.

Helen Alfredsson won her only major title, two strokes ahead of three runners-up. From Sweden, she was the first non-American to win the event as a major. Alfredsson was the rookie of the year the previous season; this was the first of her seven  on wins the LPGA Tour.

Past champions in the field

Final leaderboard
Sunday, March 28, 1993

References

External links
Golf Observer leaderboard

Chevron Championship
Golf in California
Sports competitions in California
Nabisco Dinah Shore
Nabisco Dinah Shore
Nabisco Dinah Shore
Nabisco Dinah Shore
Women's sports in California